The following is a list of notable professional skateboarders and their sponsors.

Entries with blank cells represent skateboarders who have not yet secured a sponsor in this category.

References